is the  telescope of the National Astronomical Observatory of Japan, located at the Mauna Kea Observatory on Hawaii. It is named after the open star cluster known in English as the Pleiades. It had the largest monolithic primary mirror in the world from its commissioning until 2005.

Overview 

The Subaru Telescope is a Ritchey-Chretien reflecting telescope. Instruments can be mounted at a Cassegrain focus below the primary mirror; at either of two Nasmyth focal points in enclosures on the sides of the telescope mount, to which light can be directed with a tertiary mirror; or at the prime focus in lieu of a secondary mirror, an arrangement rare on large telescopes, to provide a wide field of view suited to deep wide-field surveys.

In 1984, the University of Tokyo formed an engineering working group to develop and study the concept of a  telescope. In 1985, the astronomy committee of Japan's science council gave top priority to the development of  a "Japan National Large Telescope" (JNLT), and in 1986, the University of Tokyo signed an agreement with the University of Hawaii to build the telescope in Hawaii. In 1988, the National Astronomical Observatory of Japan was formed through a reorganization of the University's Tokyo Astronomical Observatory, to oversee the JNLT and other large national astronomy projects.

Construction of the Subaru telescope began in April 1991, and later that year, a public contest gave the telescope its official name, "Subaru Telescope". Construction was completed in 1998, and the first scientific images were taken in January 1999.  In September 1999, Princess Sayako of Japan dedicated the telescope.

A number of state-of-the-art technologies were worked into the telescope design. For example, 261 computer-controlled actuators press the main mirror from underneath, which corrects for primary mirror distortion caused by changes in the telescope orientation. The telescope enclosure building is also shaped to improve the quality of astronomical images by minimizing the effects caused by atmospheric turbulence.

Subaru is one of the few state-of-the-art telescopes to have been used with the naked eye. For the dedication, an eyepiece was constructed so that Princess Sayako could look through it directly. It was enjoyed by the staff for a few nights until it was replaced with the much more sensitive working instruments.

Subaru is the primary tool in the search for Planet Nine. Its large field of view, 75 times that of the Keck telescopes, and strong light-gathering power are suited for deep wide-field sky surveys. The search, split between a research group led by Batygin and Brown and another led by Sheppard and Trujillo, is expected to take up to five years.

Accidents during construction 
Two separate incidents claimed the lives of four workers during the construction of the telescope. On October 13, 1993, 42-year-old Paul F. Lawrence was fatally injured when a forklift tipped over onto him.  On January 16, 1996, sparks from a welder ignited insulation which smoldered, generating noxious smoke that killed Marvin Arruda, 52, Ricky Del Rosario, 38, and Warren K. "Kip" Kaleo, 36, and sent twenty-six other workers to the hospital in Hilo. All four workers are memorialized by a plaque outside the base of the telescope dome and a sign posted temporarily each January along the Mauna Kea access road.

Mishap in 2011
On July 2, 2011, the telescope operator in Hilo noted an anomaly from the top unit of the telescope. Upon further examination, coolant from the top unit was found to have leaked over the primary mirror and other parts of the telescope.
Observation using Nasmyth foci resumed on July 22, and Cassegrain focus resumed on August 26.

Instruments 

Several cameras and spectrographs can be mounted at Subaru Telescope's four focal points for observations in visible and infrared wavelengths.

 Multi-Object Infrared Camera and Spectrograph (MOIRCS)  Wide-field camera and spectrograph with the ability to take spectra of multiple objects simultaneously, mounts at the Cassegrain focus.
 Infrared Camera and Spectrograph (IRCS)  Used in conjunction with the new 188-element adaptive optics unit (AO188), mounted at the infrared Nasmyth focus.
 Cooled Mid Infrared Camera and Spectrometer (COMICS)  Mid-infrared camera and spectrometer with the ability to study cool interstellar dust, mounts on the Cassegrain focus.  Decommissioned in 2020.
 Faint Object Camera And Spectrograph (FOCAS)  Visible-light camera and spectrograph with the ability to take spectra of up to 100 objects simultaneously, mounts on the Cassegrain focus.
 Subaru Prime Focus Camera (Suprime-Cam)  80-megapixel wide-field visible-light camera, mounts at the prime focus.  Superseded by the Hyper Suprime-Cam in 2012, decommissioned in May 2017.
 High Dispersion Spectrograph (HDS)  Visible-light spectrograph mounted at the optical Nasmyth focus.
 Fiber Multi Object Spectrograph (FMOS)  Infrared spectrograph using movable fiber optics to take spectra of up to 400 objects simultaneously.  Mounts at the prime focus.
 High-Contrast Coronographic Imager for Adaptive Optics (HiCIAO)  Infrared camera for hunting planets around other stars. Used with AO188, mounted at the infrared Nasmyth focus.

 Hyper Suprime-Cam (HSC)  This 900-megapixel ultra-wide-field (1.5° field of view) camera saw first light in 2012, and was offered for open-use in 2014. The extremely large wide-field correction optics (a seven-element lens with some elements up to a meter in diameter) was manufactured by Canon and delivered March 29, 2011.  It will be used for surveys of weak lensing to determine dark matter distribution.
 Subaru Coronagraphic Extreme Adaptive Optics (SCExAO)  The Subaru Coronagraphic Extreme Adaptive Optics (SCExAO) instrument is a high-contrast imaging system for directly imaging exoplanets. The coronagraph uses a Phase Induced Amplitude Apodization (PIAA) design which means it will be able to image planets closer to their stars than conventional Lyot type coronagraph designs. For example, at a distance of 100 pc, the PIAA coronagraph on SCExAO would be able to image from 4 AU outwards while Gemini Planet Imager and VLT-SPHERE from 12 AU outwards. The system also has several other types of coronagraph: Vortex, Four-Quadrant Phase Mask and 8-Octant Phase Mask versions, and a shaped pupil coronagraph. The phase I of construction is complete and phase II construction to be complete by end of 2014 for science operations in 2015. SCExAO will initially use the HiCIAO camera but this will be replaced by CHARIS, an integral field spectrograph, around 2016.

See also 

 List of largest optical reflecting telescopes
 Yūko Kakazu

References

External links 

 
 National Astronomical Observatory of Japan
 Micro-lens for Subaru Telescope

Astronomical observatories in Hawaii
Buildings and structures in Hawaii County, Hawaii
Exoplanet search projects
Telescopes